Hiersac is a commune in the Charente department in southwestern France.

Population

Personalities
Jean-André Valletaux, French general in the French Revolutionary Wars and the Peninsular War

See also
Communes of the Charente department

References

Communes of Charente